Going My Way is an American comedy-drama series starring dancer and actor Gene Kelly. Based on the 1944 film of the same name starring Bing Crosby, the series aired on ABC with new episodes from October 3, 1962, to April 24, 1963. The program was Kelly's first and only attempt at a weekly television series. The series was cancelled after one season of 30 episodes.

The series was produced by Revue Studios (now Universal Television), as parent company MCA owned the rights to the original film through its subsidiary, EMKA, Ltd., which in 1957 bought Going My Way and many other pre-1950 sound feature films from Paramount Pictures.

Synopsis
Kelly stars as Father Chuck O'Malley, a Roman Catholic priest who is sent to St. Dominic's Parish located in a lower-class section of New York City. Dick York, later of Bewitched, portrays a character not in the film, Chuck's boyhood friend Tom Colwell, the director of a secular neighborhood youth center. Also co-starring is Leo G. Carroll as the aging pastor, Father Fitzgibbon, portrayed in the film, by Barry Fitzgerald. Nydia Westman is Mrs. Featherstone, the housekeeper of the rectory, portrayed by Eily Malyon in the film, where the character is named Mrs. Carmody. Episodes focus on Father O'Malley's attempts to connect with the congregation and his relationship with the elderly Father Fitzgibbon.

Guest stars

Ed Begley
Raymond Bailey
Dave Barry
Patricia Barry
Don Beddoe
Whit Bissell
Willis Bouchey
Eddie Bracken
Steve Brodie
Argentina Brunetti
Ellen Burstyn
Richard Carlson
Paul Carr
Nancy Carroll
Linden Chiles
Virginia Christine
Fred Clark
Richard Conte
Ellen Corby
Jerome Cowan
William Demarest
Richard Denning
Lawrence Dobkin
Ivan Dixon
Keir Dullea
James Dunn
Dan Duryea
Anthony Eisley
Ross Elliott
Robert Emhardt
Mary Field
Dianne Foster
Preston Foster
Robert Foulk
Anne Francis
Beverly Garland
Connie Gilchrist
Virginia Gregg
Don Keefer
Barry Kelley

George Kennedy
Kip King
Henry Kulky
Arch Johnson
Harry Lauter
Cloris Leachman
Peter Leeds
Forrest Lewis
Joanne Linville
Richard Long
Nora Marlowe
Kevin McCarthy
Frank McHugh
Ralph Meeker
Roger Mobley
Joanna Moore
Harry Morgan
Patricia Morrow
Bill Mumy
Barbara Nichols
Jeanette Nolan
Pat O'Brien
Gerald S. O'Loughlin
J. Pat O'Malley
Willard Parker
Vic Perrin
Michael J. Pollard
Simon Scott
Vito Scotti
Mickey Shaughnessy
Fay Spain
Harold J. Stone
Buck Taylor
Lee Tracy
Gary Vinson 
Ray Walston
Jack Warden
James Westerfield
James Whitmore
Jane Wyatt

Episode list

Home media
On December 6, 2011, Timeless Media Group released Going My Way: The Complete Series on DVD in Region 1.

References

External links 
 

1962 American television series debuts
1963 American television series endings
American Broadcasting Company original programming
1960s American comedy-drama television series
Black-and-white American television shows
English-language television shows
Catholic drama television series
Catholicism in fiction
Live action television shows based on films
Television series by Universal Television
Television shows set in New York City
Religious comedy television series